Tui Vuda is the traditional title of the paramount chief of the Vuda district in Ba Province on Fiji's northwest coast. The most recent person to hold the title is Ratu Kitione Eparama Tavaiqia.

References
Fiji Times Online

Fijian nobility
Ba Province